Thomas David McConkey (July 29, 1815 – February 21, 1890) was an Ontario businessman and political figure. He represented Simcoe North in the House of Commons of Canada as a Liberal member from 1867 to 1872.

He was born in County Tyrone, Ireland in 1815, the son of Thomas McConkey, and came to Innisfil Township in Upper Canada with his family in 1828. McConkey was a merchant in Barrie. He served as reeve there and was warden for Simcoe County from 1860 to 1861. McConkey was an unsuccessful candidate for the Legislative Assembly of the Province of Canada in 1861. He was elected to that assembly for the North riding of Simcoe in 1863 and served until Confederation; he was re-elected in 1867. From 1875  until his death, he served as sheriff for Simcoe County in Barrie.

References 

1815 births
1890 deaths
Members of the Legislative Assembly of the Province of Canada from Canada West
Liberal Party of Canada MPs
Members of the House of Commons of Canada from Ontario
Mayors of Barrie
People from County Tyrone
Irish emigrants to pre-Confederation Ontario
Immigrants to Upper Canada